The America Zone was one of the three regional zones of the 1955 Davis Cup.

7 teams entered the America Zone, with the winner going on to compete in the Inter-Zonal Zone against the winners of the Eastern Zone and Europe Zone. Australia defeated Canada in the final and progressed to the Inter-Zonal Zone.

Draw

Quarterfinals

Cuba vs. Brazil

Australia vs. Mexico

Semifinals

Canada vs. Caribbean/West Indies

Australia vs. Brazil

Final

Canada vs. Australia

References

External links
Davis Cup official website

Davis Cup Americas Zone
America Zone
Davis Cup